Soma Records may refer to:
Soma Records (U.S. label), an American record company
Soma Quality Recordings, a Scottish record label specializing in techno and house music